The Mano del Desierto is a large-scale sculpture of a hand located in the Atacama Desert in Chile, about 60 km to the south and east of the city of Antofagasta, on the Panamerican Highway. The nearest point of reference is the "Ciudad Empresarial La Negra" (La Negra Business City). It lies between the 1309 and 1310 km marker points on the highway. The piece references the human rights violations perpetrated by the Pinochet regime.

Description
The sculpture was constructed by the Chilean sculptor  at an altitude of 1,100 meters above sea and level. Its exaggerated size is said to emphasize human vulnerability and helplessness. Funded by Corporación Pro Antofagasta, a local booster organization, the sculpture was inaugurated on 28 March 1992.

It has since become a point of interest for tourists traveling Route 5, which forms part of the Pan-American Highway. It is an easy victim of graffiti and is therefore cleaned occasionally.

To get to the sculpture from Antofagasta, take Route 28 going East until the road joins Route 5 at La Negra (industrial complex) (distance from Route 1 in Antofagasta to the junction at La Negra approximately ). Take Route 5 going South for another , where a dirt road turns right (West) towards the sculpture. Clear signposts are placed on the road, although the sculpture can already be seen from quite a distance away.

Google Street View takes viewers right up to the sculpture, with various views from different directions.

See also
 Monumento al Ahogado ("The Hand"), another hand from the same artist, located on Parada 4 at Brava Beach in Punta del Este, a popular resort town in Uruguay.

References

External links

 The Hand of the Desert – Chile’s massive sculpture — Artwork description and photographs 
 Corporación Pro Antofagasta
 The giant hand buried in the Atacama Desert
 Keep Up the High Five: La Mano Del Desierto  in El Observatodo
 Hand In The Desert, Atlas Obscura</ref>

Outdoor sculptures
1992 sculptures
Buildings and structures in Antofagasta Region
Concrete sculptures
Tourist attractions in Antofagasta Region
Colossal statues